Senator Sharp or Sharpe may refer to:

John Sharp (Texas politician) (born 1950), Texas State Senate
Ron Sharp (born 1952), Oklahoma State Senate
Roger Sharpe (born 1947), North Carolina State Senate
William R. Sharpe Jr. (1928–2009), West Virginia State Senate